Kissing Darkness is a horror-thriller comedy film directed and written by James Townsend and starring Kyle Blitch, Ronnie Kroell, Sean Paul Lockhart, Daniel Berilla, Griffin Marc and Nick Airus. The film was shot in Southern California in late summer 2012.

Plot
A group of college boys, bored with the every day "gay life" of LA, decide to skip Pride weekend in exchange for a camping trip in the woods. Quickly overcome with boredom in their new surroundings, the boys venture into a game that ultimately unleashes the vengeful spirit of a local legend known as Malice Valeria. Overcome by her deadly plan of tainted love and her thirst to take back what was lost long ago, the boys must now band together before they fall victim to the poisons of a broken heart.

Cast
 Ronnie Kroell as Brett
 Sean Paul Lockhart as Jonathan
 Nick Airus as Vlad
 Kyle Blitch as Skylar
 James Townsend as Brendan
 Daniel Berilla as Ashton
 Marc Griffin as Keith
 Sean Benedict as Brendan's Lover
 Ish Bermudez as Vampire Victim
 Roger Duplease as Fiancé
 Griffin Marc as Keith
 Allusia Alusia as Lesbian #1
 Kyan Loredo as Best Friend
 Misty Violet as Lesbian #2

Production
The film had been in and out of production since 2006. The fourth attempt made it a reality. Donna Michelle, sister of writer/director, James Townsend, was originally slated to play the role of Malice Valeria. Townsend was originally supposed to play the lead role of Brett. However, once production was on the fast track, he stepped down from the role, only allowing himself to accept the much smaller role of Brendan. The film originally was slated to star Benjamin Gilbert (aka Caleb Carter). After Gilbert's death in February 2009, the film was put on hold. In 2012, Daniel Berilla was included by Townsend despite some initial reluctance by the producers.

References

External links
 

2014 films
American comedy horror films
American LGBT-related films
American thriller films
Films shot in California
Gay-related films
American vampire films
LGBT-related comedy films
2014 LGBT-related films
LGBT-related horror films
2010s comedy horror films
2014 comedy films
2010s English-language films
2010s American films